Anuraag Hari "Raag" Singhal (born 1963) is a United States district judge of the United States District Court for the Southern District of Florida.

Biography 

Singhal received a Bachelor of Arts from Rice University. He earned his Juris Doctor from the Wake Forest University School of Law. He began his career as an associate at Fleming, O'Bryan & Fleming in 1989, and spent a year there before becoming an Assistant State Attorney in Broward County. From 1993 to 2011, Singhal maintained a criminal defense and appellate practice in the Fort Lauderdale area.  He was appointed to the Seventeenth Judicial Circuit Court by Governor Rick Scott and served from 2011 to 2019.

State Supreme Court consideration 

In January 2019, Singhal was considered for one of three vacancies on the Supreme Court of Florida.

Federal judicial service 

In 2017, Singhal was one of ten finalists considered for a federal judgeship in South Florida. On August 14, 2019, President Trump announced his intent to nominate Singhal to serve as a United States District Judge of the United States District Court for the Southern District of Florida. On September 9, 2019, his nomination was sent to the Senate. He was nominated to the seat vacated by James I. Cohn, who assumed senior status on August 5, 2016. On September 11, 2019, a hearing on his nomination was held before the Senate Judiciary Committee. On October 24, 2019, his nomination was reported out of committee by a 17–5 vote. 

On December 18, 2019, the United States Senate invoked cloture on his nomination by a 76–18 vote. On December 19, 2019,  his nomination was confirmed by a 76–17 vote. He received his judicial commission on December 20, 2019. Judge Singhal is the first Asian Pacific American and Indian American to serve as an Article III federal judge in the Eleventh Circuit (Alabama, Georgia, and Florida).

Dershowitz v. CNN 

The case of Dershowitz v. CNN has been assigned to Judge Singhal. Harvard Law Professor Alan Dershowitz has sued CNN for $300 million over its coverage of statements he made on the floor of the U.S. Senate while representing former President Donald Trump during his impeachment. 

In response to a question from Sen. Ted Cruz (R-Texas), Dershowitz said that the only time a quid pro quo is unlawful is when the quo is illegal. CNN’s coverage of the day’s events focused on Dershowitz’s statement that every public official “believes that his election is in the public interest” and “if a president does something which he believes will help him get elected in the public interest, that cannot be the kind of quid pro quo that results in impeachment.”

CNN commentators suggested that the “Dershowitz Doctrine” promoted lawlessness by the president and advocated an argument made by totalitarian regimes.

Dershowitz claimed that CNN knew the commentators’ statements were false and published them with an intent to indulge hostility and harm his reputation as a constitutional scholar. CNN moved to dismiss for failure to state a claim, which was denied by Judge Singhal.

CNN’s argument that it was protected from the suit by the fair report privilege, which immunizes news agencies that report accurately on information received from government officials, was also rejected in an opinion by Judge Singhal.

The privilege doesn’t apply because CNN presented an inaccurate abridgment of Dershowitz’s comments, the court said. The commentators ignored Dershowitz’s statement “that an illegal motive for a quid pro quo would be corrupt,” it said.

CNN also said that its commentators’ statements were non-actionable opinion. Disagreeing, the court said that the complaint sufficiently alleges that the statements were mixed expressions of opinions that can be construed as defamatory.

Dershowitz’s complaint also adequately alleged actual malice by CNN, which it can attempt to refute at trial, the court said.

Rodier & Rodier represented Dershowitz. Davis Wright Tremaine LLP and Gunster represented CNN.

The case is Dershowitz v. Cable News Network Inc., S.D. Fla., No. 20-61872-CIV-Singhal, 5/25/21.

Memberships 

He became a member of the Federalist Society in 1988 and then rejoined in 2011.

From 2016 to 2017, he was President of the Stephen R. Booher Chapter of the American Inns of Court.

See also 
 List of Asian American jurists

References

External links 
 

|-

1963 births
Living people
20th-century American lawyers
21st-century American lawyers
21st-century American judges
American jurists of Indian descent
Criminal defense lawyers
Federalist Society members
Florida lawyers
Florida state court judges
Judges of the United States District Court for the Southern District of Florida
People from Philadelphia
Rice University alumni
United States district court judges appointed by Donald Trump
Wake Forest University School of Law alumni